This is a list of notable people associated with Carlisle, a city in Cumbria, England.

Born in Carlisle

Arts
John Scott RI, RBA (1849–1919), artist, born in Carlisle.

Business
Monkhouse Davison, 18th century London merchant was born in Carlisle and had homes both in Carlisle and Dalston, Cumbria. His brother John, also a grocer, was Carlisle's mayor in 1765. Tea being shipped by Davison Newman and Co. was thrown into the harbour in the Boston Tea Party which led to the American Revolution and eventually Independence.
Eddie Stobart, haulage magnate & Edward Stobart his son, were born near Carlisle
Stuart Stockdale, fashion designer, formerly head of design at Pringle of Scotland and Jaeger

Literature
Beatrix Campbell, feminist writer and journalist
Peter Cox, vegetarian cookbook author
M. W. Craven, author
Grace Dent, restaurant critic and broadcaster
Margaret Forster, novelist
Maria Hack, educational writer
Sarah Hall, Booker prize-nominated writer and poet
George MacDonald Fraser, novelist
Ryan Graham, Author

Media
Jancis Robinson, Master of Wine, journalist and wine critic
Helen Skelton, Blue Peter presenter
Lee Brennan, member of the boy band 911
Bryan Dick, TV & theatre actor, best known for his roles in Eric & Ernie, Blackpool and Torchwood
Doug Ferguson, bass player with the band Camel
Mike Figgis, film director, writer and composer, born in Carlisle
Sheila Jones Harms, soprano
Mike Harrison, lead singer of the band Spooky Tooth
Ifor James, noted international French Horn player and professor
Jon Keighren, football commentator
John Myers, radio executive
Matthew Pagan, singer with the band Collabro
Roxanne Pallett, actress, starred in Emmerdale
Melvyn Bragg, former ITV editor, BBC presenter and Radio 4 broadcaster of In Our Time (BBC Radio 4)
Mikey Bromley, singer-songwriter, former member of group Only The Young

Politics
Robert Campbell, member of the Wisconsin State Assembly
Nicholas Cox, first lieutenant-governor of New Carlisle, Quebec who named the community after his hometown
Thomas Logie MacDonald, ex-Mayor and astronomer who had a lunar crater named after him
Pam McConnell, Toronto City Counsellor
Janet Woodrow, mother of Woodrow Wilson, the 28th President of the United States was born in Carlisle. The President made a number of visits to Carlisle and the Lake District during his presidency, most famously on his "pilgrimage of the heart" on 29 December 1918. This visit is commemorated by a plaque on the wall at the Carlisle City Church on Lowther Street
Edward Tiffin, United States Senator and 1st Governor of Ohio

Sport
Kevin Beattie, former England football international
Steve Borthwick, former captain of the England rugby union team
Jarrad Branthwaite, Everton defender
Paul Hindmarch, cricketer
Grant Holt, Norwich City striker
Paul Huntington, Leeds United and Newcastle United footballer
Matt Jansen, former England U21 and Blackburn Rovers striker, born in Wetheral, near Carlisle
Alex MacDowall, World Touring Car Championship driver
Paul Nixon, England cricketer
Henry Potts, cricketer and footballer
Paul Simpson, former footballer and manager
Lauren Smith, badminton player
Derek Townsley, professional footballer
Geoff Twentyman, footballer and subsequent head scout for Liverpool F.C. under Bill Shankly was born in Brampton near Carlisle
Alan Gray (footballer), football defender born 1974
Peter Thompson (English footballer), former Liverpool F.C player born 1942

Resident of Carlisle
Ivor Broadis, ex England international footballer and journalist moved to Carlisle after the Second World War
Hunter Davies, writer and journalist, brought up in Carlisle
Rory Delap, professional footballer who plays for Stoke City FC.
Richard Hammond, TV presenter, lived in Carlisle
Richard Madeley, TV personality, worked for BBC Carlisle and Border Television
Peter Manley, professional darts player
William James Blacklock, 19th-century landscape artist, studied in Carlisle and later had a studio in Stanwix
Charlie Hunnam, actor, attended art college in Carlisle. Best known for roles in the series Queer as Folk, Sons of Anarchy and films Pacific Rim and Green Street.
Bill Shankly, former manager of Carlisle United
Rumer, singer, also known as Sarah Joyce. Attended Newman School in Carlisle.

References

 
Carlisle, Cumbria
People from Carlisle